Flint River Academy (FRA) is a segregation academy in Woodbury, Georgia, United States. It is a member of the Georgia Independent School Association. The school was founded in 1967, when the Federal government was beginning to mandate school integration. The school educates students in grades PK-12 and while the school handbook says it does not discriminate based on race, as of 2020 the overwhelming majority of students were white.

History
As of 1970, the students were bused to the school from 13 counties. The school urged parents to pool funds to buy buses and pay drivers. According to the Southern Regional Council, 45% of FRA students were bused to school, with an average one way travel distance of 20 miles.

In 1972, Flint River Academy was expelled from Georgia Association of Independent Schools because the school refused to cut ties with segregationists. Segregationist Georgia Governor Lester Maddox dedicated the school at its opening.

Athletics
The school fields varsity and junior varsity teams in sports including football, basketball, baseball, softball, tennis, track, twirl, and shotgun, using the nicknames Wildcats and Lady Wildcats. The girls' softball team won the GISA class AA championship in 2010. The baseball team won the 2008 class A GISA title.

The football team has won five GISA championships, in 1980, 2005, 2007, 2016, and 2018. From 2004 to 2009 the Wildcats played in five straight GISA title games, winning two of them. Over this period the team won 44 straight home games and 39 regular season games in a row. The seniors of 2008 finished with a 55-3 record and two GISA titles. The Wildcats basketball team won the GISA class A Championship in the 2018-19 season.

Demographics
Although the school handbook states the school does not discriminate based on race, 209 of 212 students, or 98.6%, were white as of 2020.
As of the 2020 school year, the school reported to the NCES that they had 212 students in kindergarten through 12th grade. Of those, 209 or 98.6% were White, 2, or less than 1% were Black, and 1 was of two or more races. The city of Woodbury is 38% White, while the county is 40% White.

Activities
Students at Flint River Academy compete in art shows, Literary, and One Act play. Flint River Academy won first place in 2011 in the GISA AA Division of Math Bowl in Americus, Georgia at Georgia Southwestern State University.

Campus
In 2011, Flint River Academy added a  building for students in grades 5 through 8.

References

Educational institutions established in 1967
Schools in Meriwether County, Georgia
Preparatory schools in Georgia (U.S. state)
Private high schools in Georgia (U.S. state)
Private middle schools in Georgia (U.S. state)
Private elementary schools in Georgia (U.S. state)
Segregation academies in Georgia